Serie B is the second level Italian football league.

Serie B may also refer to:

Campeonato Brasileiro Série B, a Brazilian football league
Ecuadorian Serie B, an Ecuadorian football league
Serie B (baseball), an Italian baseball league
Serie B (men's water polo), an Italian water polo league
Serie B (women's football), an Italian women's football league
Serie B Basket, an Italian basketball league
Serie B de México, an association football league
Lega B, the governing body of the Serie B Italian football league